The Women's 100m Backstroke event at the 2007 Pan American Games occurred at the Maria Lenk Aquatic Park in Rio de Janeiro, Brazil, with the final being swum on July 19.

Medalists

Results

Finals

Semifinals

Preliminaries

References
For the Record, Swimming World Magazine, September 2007 (p. 48+49)

Backstroke, Women's 100
2007 in women's swimming